The Rudolf Virchow Awards are annual American awards in anthropology.

About the Award 
The Rudolf Virchow Awards are given by the Critical Anthropology for Global Health Study Group, a special interest group of Society for Medical Anthropology. The professional award honors an article and the graduate and undergraduate student awards, a paper written in the spirit of Rudolf Virchow, that is deemed by the judges to best reflect, extend or advance critical perspectives in medical anthropology. These are materialist approaches that emphasize the social and political economic nature of health, disease and healing, and which embrace both micro and macro perspectives.

Rudolf Virchow, a German physician writing during the 1800s, was a key founder of social medicine. In addition to writing in the areas of anthropology and medical science, his contributions to social medicine centered on his recognition of the multiple interacting factors, particularly social factors, that produce disease and illness. He argued that the difficult circumstances and deprivations of the working class increase susceptibility to disease as well as to higher mortality rates. Virchow also recognized the political and material circumstances that inhibited disease prevention efforts and viewed advocacy as an essential part of medical research. He was perhaps most articulate about the limitations of medical science to improving health in the absence of material security. Virchow viewed the state as responsible for providing that security through employment of those who could work. His appreciation for the complex relationship among health, medicine and society are remembered in his statement, “Medicine is a social science, and politics is nothing more than medicine in larger scale”.

Criteria and Eligibility 
The professional award is given annually for an article, singly or co-authored, and published during the previous year in either a peer reviewed journal (either a print or on-line journal) or an edited volume.  This prize will be given to professionals, or to graduate students who have singly or co-authored the published their work.

The graduate student award will be granted to a paper that was written in the prize year or the preceding year and that has not been subjected to the process of editorial review.  Papers that have been submitted to a journal or edited volume, but that have not yet benefited from review, may be included in this category.  Theses and dissertations cannot be accepted.  However, a summary of a thesis or a dissertation (no greater than about 30 pages) that can stand on its own, or a chapter that has been revised and can also stand on its own, will be considered for this award.  Papers from students who have graduated after the paper was written will still be accepted under this category. Only papers, not interactive media, will be considered for this award. 

The undergraduate student award will be given to a paper that was written the prize year or the preceding year while the student was still an undergraduate.  Theses will not be accepted.  However, a shortened version (up to about 30 pages) of the thesis (or a chapter from the thesis) that has been revised to stand on its own will be considered for this award. Only papers, not interactive media, will be considered at this time.

Past winners 
2016 - Graduate Prize: Thando Malambo
2016 - Undergraduate Prize: Maggie Acosta
2015 - Professional Award: Fouzieyha Towghi
2015 - Graduate Prize: Sarah Raskin
2015 - Undergraduate Prize: Naomi Zucker
2014 - Professional Award: Stacy Leigh Pigg
2014 - Graduate Prize: Kimberly Sue
2014 - Undergraduate Prize: Savannah Harshbarger
2013 - Professional Award: Susan Erikson - "Global Health Business"
2013 - Graduate Prize: Bo Kyeong Seo; Rachel Irwin
2012 - Professional Award: Sarah Willen
2012 - Graduate Prize: Nora J Kenworthy
2012 - Undergraduate Prize: Victor Koski Karell 
2011 - Undergraduate Prize: Claire M. Wagner 
2011 - Professional Award: Sharon Abramowitz - "Trauma and Humanitarian Translation in Liberia: The Tale of Open Mole"
2010 - Graduate Prize: Emily Yates-Doerr "The Opacity of Reduction: Nutritional Black-Boxing and the Meanings of Nourishment."
2009 - Professional Award: Sherine Hamdy
2009 - Graduate Prize: Serena Stein
2009 - Undergraduate Prize: Ari Samsky
2008 - Professional Award: Joao Biehl
2008 - Graduate Prize: Ippolytos Kalofonos - " 'All I Eat is ARVs': Paradoxes of AIDS Treatment Programs in Central Mozambique" 
2007 - Professional Award: Philippe Bourgois and Jeff Schonberg - “Intimate Apartheid: Ethnic Dimensions of Habitus among Homeless Heroin Injectors”
2007 - Graduate Student Award: Krista Schumacher - “Beyond Cultural Competency: An Analysis of Key Variables Affecting Aids Care among Patients at an Urban Indian Health Clinic”
2007 - Undergraduate Award: Aki Nakanishi - “Protecting Indigenous Medical Knowledge: Confronting Biopiracy and Neo-cultural Imperialism”
2006 - Charles L. Briggs, Professional Prize for “Critical Perspectives on Health and Communicative Hegemony: Progressive Possibilities, Lethal Connections”
2006 - Seth M. Holmes, Graduate Student Prize for Oaxacans Like to Work Bent Over: The Naturalization of Social Suffering among Berry Farm Workers”
2006 - Alexa Dietrich, Graduate Student Prize for “Corrosion in the System: The Community Health By-Products of Pharmaceutical Production in Northern Puerto Rico”
2005 - Paul Farmer and Arachu Castro, Professional Prize
2005 - João Biehl, Professional Prize
2005 - Michael Westerhaus, Graduate Student Prize
2004 - James Pfeiffer, Professional Prize
2004 - Sarah Willen, Graduate Student Prize - “Birthing ‘Invisible’ Children: State Power, NGO Activism, and Reproductive Health among Undocumented Migrant Workers in Tel Aviv”  
2004 - Hanna Garth, Undergraduate Student Prize
2003 - Barbara Rylko-Bauer and Paul Farmer, Professional Prize
2003 - Cesar Abadia, Graduate Student Prize
2003 - Scott Sang-Hyan Lee, Undergraduate Prize
2002 - Michael Ennis-McMillan, Professional Prize
2002 - Sarah Horton, Student Prize
2000 - Carolyn Smith, First Rudolf Virchow Student Prize
1995 - Donna Goldstein: AIDS and Women in Brazil: The Emerging Problem, Social Science and Medicine 39(7).
1994 - Hans Baer: How Critical Can Clinical Anthropology Be?, Medical Anthropology 15(3):299-317.
1993 - Soheir Morsy: Bodies of Choice: Norplant Experimental Trials on Egyptian Women .
1992 - Mark & Mimi Nichter: Hype and Weight, Medical Anthropology 13:249-284, 1991
1991 - Merrill Singer: Reinventing Medical Anthropology: Toward a Critical Realignment, Social Science and Medicine 30(2):179-187 (1990).
1990 - John O'Neil - The Politics of Patient Dissatisfaction in Cross-Cultural Clinical Encounters: A Canadian Inuit example, Medical Anthropology 3 (4): 325-344.
1989 - Lynn Morgan, Dependency theory in the political economy of health: An anthropological critique.  Medical Anthropology Quarterly 1(2):131-154. 1987.
1988 - Ellen Lazarus
1987 - Ronnie Frankenberg

See also

 List of anthropology awards
 Virchow Prize for Global Health

References 
Critical Medical Anthropology of Health Interest Group

External links 
 American Anthropological Association
 Society for Medical Anthropology

American awards
Anthropology awards
Rudolf Virchow